The East Coast Conference (ECC) is a college athletic conference affiliated with the National Collegiate Athletic Association (NCAA) at the Division II level. Member institutions are located primarily in the state of New York, with a single member located in the District of Columbia.

History

The East Coast Conference was founded in 1989 as the New York Collegiate Athletic Conference (NYCAC). Its charter members included Adelphi University (1989–2009), Concordia College (1989–2009), C.W. Post College (1989–2019), Dowling College (1989–2016), Mercy College (1989–present), Molloy College (1989–present), New York Institute of Technology (NYIT) (1989–2020), Pace University (1989–1997), Queens College (1989–present) and Southampton College of Long Island University (1989–2005).

Other members that joined were: University of Bridgeport (2000–2022), University of New Haven (2002–2008), New Jersey Institute of Technology (NJIT) (1997–2000), Philadelphia University (1991–2005), College of Saint Rose (1991–2000), St. Thomas Aquinas College (2000–present), University of the District of Columbia (2011–present), Roberts Wesleyan University (2012–present), Daemen University (2013–present), D'Youville University (2020–present) and College of Staten Island (2020–present).

The ECC has become a lacrosse powerhouse, seeing six ECC teams win the Division II Men's Lacrosse championship over the past 10 years. In addition, at least 1 ECC team has competed in 13 the last 14 championship games. Recent ECC champions include Adelphi (1998, 1999, 2001), C.W. Post (1996, 2006 Tri-Champion), Dowling College (2006 Tri-Champion), NYIT (1997, 2003, 2005, 2008), and Mercyhurst College (2006 Tri-Champion, 2007)

Two changes to the conference membership were announced in the fall of 2018. First, it was announced on October 3, 2018 that Long Island University would unite its two athletic programs—the Division II LIU Post program and Division I program at LIU Brooklyn—into a single Division I program under the overall university name effective in 2019–20. Second, it was announced on December 7, 2018 that beginning with the 2020 season (2019–20 school year), Frostburg State University will join the conference as an associate member in men's lacrosse, contingent on being accepted into Division II by the NCAA.

The next change in conference membership was announced in March 2019, when the College of Staten Island (CSI), preparing to begin a transition from NCAA Division III, was accepted as a member effective with the 2020–21 school year. The following August, Tusculum University was announced as a bowling affiliate, effective in 2019–20. In March 2020, then-current Division III member D'Youville College ("University" since 2022) was announced as a future member effective in 2020–21, contingent on NCAA approval of that school's transition to D-II; the NCAA's acceptance was officially announced on July 10, 2020.

In December 2021, the University of Bridgeport published its acceptance into the Central Atlantic Collegiate Conference as its new member for the 2022–23 school year.

Chronological timeline
 1989 - The East Coast Conference (ECC) was founded as the New York Collegiate Athletic Conference (NYCAC). Its charter members included Adelphi University, Concordia College of New York, Dowling College, the C.W. Post Campus of Long Island University (LIU Post), Mercy College, Molloy College, the New York Institute of Technology (New York Tech or NYIT), Pace University, Queens College and Southampton College of Long Island University, effective beginning the 1989-90 academic year.
 1991 - The Philadelphia College of Textiles & Science (now Thomas Jefferson University) and the College of Saint Rose joined the NYCAC, effective in the 1991-92 academic year.
 1997 - Pace left the NYCAC to join the Northeast-10 Conference (NE-10), effective after the 1996-97 academic year.
 1997 - The New Jersey Institute of Technology (New Jersey Tech or NJIT) joined the NYCAC, effective in the 1997-98 academic year.
 2000 - Two institutions left the NYCAC to join their respective new home primary conferences: New Jersey Tech (NJIT) to join the Central Atlantic Collegiate Conference (CACC) and Saint Rose to join the NE-10, both effective after the 1999-2000 academic year.
 2000 - The University of Bridgeport and St. Thomas Aquinas College joined the NYCAC, effective in the 2000-01 academic year.
 2002 - The University of New Haven joined the NYCAC, effective in the 2002-03 academic year.
 2005 - Two institutions left the NYCAC to join their respective new home primary conferences: Philadelphia to join the CACC, and LIU–Southampton to discontinue its athletic program and close the school, both effective after the 2004-05 academic year.
 2005 - Mercyhurst University joined the NYCAC as an affiliate member for men's lacrosse, effective in the 2006 spring season (2005-06 academic year).
 2006 - The NYCAC has been renamed as the East Coast Conference (ECC), effective in the 2006-07 academic year.
 2006 - Dominican College of New York joined the ECC as an affiliate member for men's lacrosse, effective in the 2007 spring season (2006-07 academic year).
 2008 - Adelphi left the ECC to join the NE-10, effective after the 2007-08 academic year.
 2009 - Two institutions left the ECC to join their respective new home primary conferences: Adelphi to join the NE-10, and Concordia (N.Y.) to join the CACC, both effective after the 2008-09 academic year.
 2009 - Four institutions joined the ECC as affiliate members: Chestnut Hill College and Wheeling Jesuit University for only men's lacrosse, Lake Erie College and Seton Hill University for men's and women's lacrosse, all effective in the 2010 spring season (2009-10 academic year).
 2011 - The University of the District of Columbia joined the ECC, effective in the 2011-12 academic year.
 2012 - Three institutions left the ECC as affiliate members: Lake Erie and Seton Hill for men's and women's lacrosse for men's lacrosse, and Mercyhurst and Wheeling Jesuit for only men's lacrosse, all effective after the 2012 spring season (2011-12 academic year).
 2012 - Roberts Wesleyan University joined the ECC, effective in the 2012-13 academic year.
 2012 - Georgian Court University joined the ECC as an affiliate member for men's & women's indoor track & field, effective in the 2007 spring season (2006-07 academic year).
 2013 - Daemen College ("University" since 2022) joined the ECC, effective in the 2013-14 academic year.
 2015 - Felician University, Franklin Pierce University and Kutztown University of Pennsylvania joined the ECC as affiliate members for bowling (with Adelphi re-joining for that sport), effective in the 2016 spring season (2015-16 academic year).
 2016
 Dowling left the ECC to announce that the school would close, effective after the 2015-16 academic year.
 Three institutions joined the ECC as affiliate members: Holy Family University for men's and women's indoor track & field, and Lincoln Memorial University and Salem University for bowling, all effective in the 2017 spring season (2016-17 academic year).
 2017
 Three institutions left the ECC as affiliate members: Chestnut Hill and Dominican (N.Y.) for men's lacrosse, and Salem for bowling, all effective after the 2017 spring season (2016-17 academic year).
 Wilmington University of Delaware joined the ECC as an affiliate member for bowling (with Chestnut Hill rejoining for that sport), effective in the 2018 spring season (2017-18 academic year).
 2018
 Franklin Pierce left the ECC as an affiliate member for bowling, effective after the 2018 spring season (2017-18 academic year).
 Bloomfield College and Caldwell University joined the ECC as affiliate members for bowling, effective in the 2019 spring season (2018-19 academic year).
 2019
 Long Island University, the parent of LIU Post, announced that it would merge the Post athletic program with the D-I athletic program of its Brooklyn campus after the 2018–19 academic year, creating a D-I program that now competes as the LIU Sharks.
 Three institutions joined the ECC as affiliate members: Frostburg State University for men's lacrosse, Lincoln University of Pennsylvania for baseball and women's soccer, and Tusculum University for bowling, all effective in the 2020 spring season (2019-20 academic year).
 2020
 New York Tech (NYIT) left the ECC to announce that the school would suspend its athletic programs until further notice (at least two years), effective after the 2019-20 academic year.
 D'Youville College ("University" since 2022) and the College of Staten Island joined the ECC, effective in the 2020-21 academic year.
 2021 – Lincoln Memorial and Tusculum left the ECC as affiliate members for bowling, effective after the 2021 spring season (2020-21 academic year).
 2022
 Bridgeport announced that it would leave the ECC to join the CACC, effective after the 2021-22 academic year.
 Division I member Bryant University and Saint Anselm College joined as affiliate members in bowling, effective with the 2022-23 academic year.
 Bloomfield College, Caldwell University, Chestnut Hill College, Felician University, and Wilmington University of Delaware left the ECC as affiliate members for bowling when their full-time conference home of the CACC launched a bowling league in the 2022–23 season.

Member schools

Current members
The ECC currently has nine full members, all but three are private schools. Reclassifying members in yellow:

Affiliate members
The ECC currently has 10 affiliate members, most are private schools.

Notes

Former members
The ECC had ten former full members, all but one were private schools:

Notes

Former affiliate members
The ECC had 14 former affiliate members, all but one were private schools:

Notes

Membership timeline

Sports

The East Coast Conference sponsors intercollegiate athletic competition in the following sports:

Men's sponsored sports by school

Women's sponsored sports by school

Other sponsored sports by school

References

External links